Sir Lucas Dillon of Loughglynn (1579–1656) was in 1628 one of the negotiators of the Graces; he was MP for Roscommon in the two Irish Parliaments of Charles I. At the Irish Rebellion of 1641 he sided with the rebels and joined the Irish Catholic Confederation, where he served on the Supreme Council.

Birth and origins 
Lucas was born in 1579, the second son of Theobald Dillon and Eleanor Tuite. His father would become the first Viscount Dillon in 1622. His mother was a daughter of Sir Edward Tuite of Tuitestown, County Westmeath, and widow of William Tuite of Monilea. His father's side of the family descended from Lord Dillon of Drumraney, County Westmeath. His father's family was Old English and descended from Sir Henry Dillon who came to Ireland with Prince John in 1185.

Marriage and children 
Lucas Dillon married Jane Moore, daughter of Garret Moore.

Lucas and Jane had four sons:
Robert, married Rose Dillon of Streamstown and was the father of the 7th Lord Dillon

Nothing seems to be known of the other sons and of daughters.

Later life

The Graces 

In June 1627 a convention was elected in Ireland that chose 11 agents to be sent to England to negotiate with the King. Sir Lucas was one of them. Three were Protestants, the remaining eight Old English Catholics.

Nephew's wardship 
On 8 December 1630 Sir Lucas bought the wardship of his nephew Thomas Dillon, 4th Viscount Dillon, who was then 15 years old.

Parliaments of 1634–1635 and 1640–1649 
Sir Lucas sat for Roscommon County in the parliaments of 1634–1635 and the Parliament 1640–1649.

Irish Catholic Confederation

The Cessation 
On 15 September 1643 at Sigginstown, Strafford's unfinished house, the Confederates signed a cease-fire with Ormond, called the "Cessation". Sir Lucas was one of the signatories for the Confederates. The Confederates agreed to pay the King £30,000 (about £ in ) in several instalments.

Second Ormond Peace 
n January 1649, the Second Ormond Peace was signed. The Irish Catholic Confederation was dissolved, and power handed to 12 Commissioners of Trust of which Sir Lucas was one. On 2 August Jones defeated the Irish royalists under Ormond, who had been besieging Dublin, at the Battle of Rathmines.

Death and timeline 
Dillon died in 1656.

Notes and references

Notes

Citations

Sources 
Subject matter monographs:
Click here. Murphy in Dictionary of Irish Biography

 
  – 1642 to 1660
  – 1624 to 1632
  – Dacre to Dysart (for Dillon)
  – Scotland and Ireland
 
  – (for timeline)
  – History based on Richard Bellings’s memoirs
 
 
 
  – Viscounts (for Dillon)
 
 
 
 

1579 births
1656 deaths
Dillon, Lucas
Dillon, Lucas
Irish Roman Catholic Confederates
Members of the Parliament of Ireland (pre-1801) for County Roscommon constituencies
MacCarthy